Xylergates picturatus is a species of beetle in the family Cerambycidae. It was described by Lane in 1957.

References

Acanthocinini
Beetles described in 1957